Sir Perceval Maitland Laurence  (20 April 185428 February 1930) was an English classical scholar, judge in South Africa and a benefactor of the University of Cambridge and the University of Cape Town.

Early life and education
Perceval Maitland Laurence was born on  20 April 1854 in Woking the eldest son of Perceval Laurence, a clergyman and Isabella Sarah Moorsom.

In 1872 Laurence went up to Corpus Christi College, Cambridge to read Classics, graduating with first class honours in 1876. Like his father before him, he was President of the Cambridge Union Society, holding office in the Easter Term of 1874.

The law
On graduating his studies turned to the law. As a fellow of Corpus Christi, he was awarded the Yorke Prize in 1878 for his essay, written jointly with Courtney Stanhope Kenny, on The Law and Custom of Primogeniture, the Master of Laws degree in 1879, the Chancellor's Gold Medal for Legal Studies and in 1885 the degree of Doctor of Laws.

Laurence was called to the Bar by Lincoln's Inn on 18 November 1878 but the effects of tuberculosis curtailed his English practice of the law and took him instead to the Cape Colony for the beneficial effect of the drier climate. He practised initially in Kimberley before being appointed second puisne judge of the High Court of Griqualand in 1882 and subsequently becoming Judge President in 1888. Moving to Cape Town in 1905, he served as Chairman of the War Losses Compensation Commission and the Transvaal Delimitation Commissions, for which he was knighted in 1906.

Retirement
In 1913 Laurence retired and returned to England and in 1914 was made an honorary fellow of Corpus Christi College. In 1921-23 he served on the Royal Commission on Fire Brigades and Fire Prevention. His final work was a biography of John Xavier Merriman, the last prime minister of the Cape Colony, published in 1930, the year of Laurence's death.

Benefactor
Laurence died on 28 February 1930. By his will he endowed funds at Cambridge University for the benefit of the Cambridge University Library, to establish the Laurence Professorship of Ancient Philosophy and the Laurence Professorship of Classical Archaeology and to provide funds generally for the purposes of classical studies. He also endowed his college,  Corpus Christi, with funds to support the study of classics and prizes in his name continue to be awarded. In 1925 he endowed the University of Cape Town with the Sir Laurence Gift which supports the Laurence Prize (awarded annually to the best undergraduate student in Ancient Greek).

Publications
 Two Essays on the Law of Primogeniture (with Courtney Stanhope Kenny), 1878, reprinted by Kessinger Publishing 2008, 
 Judges and Litigants, London 1879
 Collectanea: Essays, Addresses And Reviews, 1899, reprinted by Kessinger Publishing June 2008 
 Catalogue of the Kimberley Public Library, 1891, Compiled by P. M. Laurence ASIN: B0014NV3JE
 Reports of Cases decided in the High Court of Griqualand. Reported by P. M. Laurence ASIN: B0014JX9DQ
 On Circuit in Kaffirland, and other sketches and studies, 1903
 The life of John Xavier Merriman, Constable, London, 1930

References

1854 births
1930 deaths
People from Woking
Alumni of Corpus Christi College, Cambridge
Fellows of Corpus Christi College, Cambridge
Knights Commander of the Order of St Michael and St George
Presidents of the Cambridge Union
Members of Lincoln's Inn
Cape Colony judges
19th-century South African judges
19th-century South African lawyers
20th-century South African judges